USA-266, also known as GPS IIF-12, GPS SVN-70 and NAVSTAR 76, is an American navigation satellite which forms part of the Global Positioning System. It was the twelfth of twelve Block IIF satellites to be launched.

Launch 
Built by Boeing and launched by United Launch Alliance (ULA), USA-266 was launched at 13:38 UTC on 5 February 2016, atop an Atlas V 401 launch vehicle, vehicle number AV-057. The launch took place from Space Launch Complex 41 at the Cape Canaveral Air Force Station, and placed USA-266 directly into semi-synchronous orbit.

Orbit 
It is used to broadcast the PRN 32 signal, and operates in slot 5 of plane F of the GPS constellation. It is currently in service following commissioning on 9 March 2016.

References 

Spacecraft launched in 2016
GPS satellites
USA satellites
Spacecraft launched by Atlas rockets